USS Steuben County (LST-1138) was an  built for the United States Navy during World War II. Named after counties in Indiana, and New York, she was the only U.S. Naval vessel to bear the name.

Service history
Completed too late for service in World War II, LST-1138 performed occupation duty in the Far East until early January 1946. After post-war operations with the Pacific Fleet, LST-1138 saw extensive service during the Korean War, including the 1950 amphibious assault at Inchon, and a Korean prisoner exchange in 1953. She earned five battle stars for her service. During various cruises across the Pacific, she ranged as far north as Barrow, Alaska, and as far south as Taka Atoll in the Marshall Islands. On 1 July 1955, she was renamed Steuben County (LST-1138) (q.v.) after counties in Indiana and New York. She was struck from the Navy List on 1 February 1961 and sold to Zidell Explorations, Inc., Portland, Oregon, on 11 August 1961. Zidell had by that time expanded from shipbreaking into building barges with steel recovered from decommissioned ships, including Steuben County.

Footnotes

References

External links
 Serving on LST-1138 from 1953 through 1955
 

 

LST-542-class tank landing ships
Cold War amphibious warfare vessels of the United States
Korean War amphibious warfare vessels of the United States
Ships built in Seneca, Illinois
Steuben County, Indiana
Steuben County, New York
1945 ships